The women's 200 metre individual medley competition of the swimming events at the 2011 World Aquatics Championships took place July 24 and 25. The heats and semifinals took place July 24 and the final was held July 25.

Records
Prior to the competition, the existing world and championship records were as follows.

Results

Heats

38 swimmers participated in 5 heats, qualified swimmers are listed:

Semifinals
The semifinals were held at 18:24.

Semifinal 1

Semifinal 2

Final
The final was held 19:17.

References

External links
2011 World Aquatics Championships: Women's 200 metre individual medley entry list, from OmegaTiming.com; retrieved 2011-07-23.

Individual medley 200 metre, women's
World Aquatics Championships
2011 in women's swimming